Linda Burnley is an English former cricketer who played as a wicket-keeper. She appeared in one One Day International for England, against Ireland at Castle Avenue, Dublin in August 1990. She scored 30 runs and took one catch. She played domestic cricket for Yorkshire.

References

External links
 
 

Living people
Year of birth missing (living people)
Place of birth missing (living people)
England women One Day International cricketers
Yorkshire women cricketers